Three of a Kind is a 1944 American comedy film directed by D. Ross Lederman and starring Billy Gilbert.

Plot

Cast
 Billy Gilbert as Billy
 Shemp Howard as Shemp Howard
 Max Rosenbloom as Maxie (as Maxie Rosenbloom)
 Helen Gilbert as Belle Collins
 June Lang as Delores O'Toole
 Robert Henry as Jimmy Collins (as Buzzy Henry)
 Paul Phillips as Paul Collins
 Wheeler Oakman as Oliver
 Franklin Parker as McGinty
 Marie Austin as Short Singer
 Sheila Roberts as Gilbert's Stooge
 Robert McKenzie as Pawnbroker (as Bob McKenzie)
 Syd Saylor as Customer
 Harris Ashburn as Radio Rascal
 Jimie Haine as Radio Rascal (as Jimmie Haine)
 Dick Carlton as Radio Rascal
 Frank Jaquet as Judge
 Milton Kibbee as Welfare Worker

References

External links
 

1944 films
1944 comedy films
American comedy films
1940s English-language films
American black-and-white films
Films directed by D. Ross Lederman
1940s American films